"This Is the Day" is a song by American band Ivy, included on their second studio album, Apartment Life (1997). It was released as the record's third single in the United States on October 19, 1998 by 550 Music following its inclusion in the 1998 American comedy film There's Something About Mary. The group had just been dropped by Atlantic Records but eventually signed to 550 Music after they reissued the parent album. The track was written by Dominique Durand, Adam Schlesinger and Andy Chase, with the latter two producing it. It is a pop and alternative pop song that features the use of horns and was compared to the works of the Smiths.

It was released as a CD single in two different formats, with the commercial release featuring two previously unreleased bonus tracks and the promotional release featuring just the album version of "This Is the Day". Music critics liked the track, with most considering it a standout track and noting the possibility of it making Apartment Life more successful.

Background and release 
"This Is the Day" was taken from Ivy's second studio album Apartment Life which was released on October 7, 1997 by Atlantic Records. It was prominently featured in the 1998 American comedy film There's Something About Mary and was also included on the film's official soundtrack. Reflecting on its usage in the film, Durand commented that it was unimaginable to see their songs in several scenes and that she "fe[lt] so grateful to have something like that in a movie". The song was recorded in 1997 in New York City at three different recording studios. Despite Atlantic Records signing Ivy earlier in 1997, they were later dropped and picked up by 550 Music. Following its inclusion on the film, the aforementioned label distributed the song to radio stations across the United States on October 19, 1998. It was issued as a CD single in the United States; including bonus tracks "Sleeping Late" and "Sweet Mary". Additionally, 550 Music reissued Apartment Life in the United States with new cover art and digitally remastered tracks, while both Schlesinger and Chase opened up a new recording studio titled Stratosphere in New York City in June 1999. Furthermore in the late 1990s, "This Is the Day" would be included on the Pepsi-issued album Pepsi Pop Culture (1998) and the 1999 compilation album titled Live a Little, Vol. 1.

Composition 
"This Is the Day" was written by Dominique Durand, Adam Schlesinger and Andy Chase, with the latter two also serving as producers. Musicians Paul Q. Kolderie and Sean Slade served as the mixers, with Matthew Ellard being an assistant to them; additionally, Bob Ludwig finalized the mastering. Additionally, fellow musician James Iha contributes backing vocals to the track. A pop and alternative pop song, Durand sings about an ended relationship, with the chorus consisting of her saying, "She's never com-ing back". Noting the use of "60s-ish horns", Jack Rabid from AllMusic called its genre "la-la-la pop personified". The addition of horns was brand new for Ivy, as they tried to incorporate more instruments into the songs on Apartment Life. Also regarding the horn section, Kurt B. Reighley from CMJ New Music Monthly joked that the Smiths must have "overlooked" the song and its "punchy melody". Agreeing, Vickie Gilmer and Ira Robbins from Trouser Press compared it to the same group and called it a "jaunty" track.

Critical reception 
"The Best Thing" received favorable feedback from music critics. Frank Tortorici of MTV News used the track to prove that Ivy was much different than Schlesinger's other band Fountains of Wayne; he compared the sound to Blondie and called it "bouncy". He also felt that the track would give Apartment Life the much "needed push" in order for it to be a successful release. In addition to "The Best Thing" (1997) and "You Don't Know Anything" (1999), AllMusic's Rabid called the single one of the "pleasantly produced, precisely structured pop dreams that makes fans sing along" on Apartment Life. An editor at ROCKRGRL felt that given "This Is the Day", Ivy should have "gained more than a moment's attention". Hans Koller and Joyce Grenfell, contributors to The Encyclopedia of Popular Music, considered "This Is the Day" and "Baker" as the two best tracks on Apartment Life. Additionally, a Sputnikmusic member noted in their album review that "if you only have a dollar", the listener should "download th[is] track".

Track listings 

CD single
 "This Is the Day" 3:33
 "Sleeping Late" 2:30
 "Sweet Mary" 3:14

Promotional CD single
 "This Is the Day" 3:33

Credits and personnel 
Credits and personnel adapted from Apartment Life.
Management
 Recorded at The Place, New York City; Duotone Studios, New York City; and Compositions, New York City

Personnel

Andy Chase – engineering, executive producer, mixing
Dominique Durand – lead and background vocals
Matthew Ellard – assistant mixing
Philippe Garcia – photography
Josh Grier – legal
James Iha – background vocals, additional production

Paul Q. Kolderie – mixing
Bob Ludwig – mastering
Q Prime – management
Brenda Rotheiser – art direction, design
Adam Schlesinger – engineering, executive producer, mixing
Sean Slade – mixing

References

Citations

Bibliography 

Ivy (band) songs
1997 songs
1998 singles
550 Music singles
Songs written by Adam Schlesinger
Songs written by Dominique Durand
Songs written by Andy Chase